Melisa Mbile Sánchez Nâwara (born ), is an Equatorial Guinean businesswoman, entrepreneur and corporate executive, who is the chief executive officer of La Capacidad, a clothing line that she founded and owns. Her business also mentors young people to acquire the work ethic, develop customer relationship skills and learn prompt service delivery in addition to gaining self confidence.

Background and education
Melissa was born in Malabo, the capital city of Equatorial Guinea, circa 1994. After attending schools locally, she was admitted to university, graduating with a bachelor's degree in economics, at age 23 years old. She has ambitions to complete a master's degree in digital marketing.

Career
Melissa has private sector experience where she has overseen, analyzed and supervised development projects. In 2018, she began to design "Afro-contemporary costumes", displayed and marketed with the Logo of her company. When describing herself, she says: "I am a fashion designer, dancer, choreographer, singer and actress".

Other considerations
As of September 2021, 12 young people, (referred to as "interns") have transitioned through La Capacidad. The company itself maintains five full-time employees.

Melissa has two other ambitions, one is to turn her company into a fashion house. The other is to build a "School of Arts" in Equatorial Guinea. She is fluent in French, English and Spanish.

See also
 Rosa Malango

References

External links
 Bange IMPULSA, a project to support entrepreneurship in Equatorial Guinea As of 12 August 2021.

1994 births
Living people
Equatoguinean women business executives
Equatoguinean chief executives
Women chief executives
21st-century businesspeople
21st-century businesswomen
People from Malabo